Franklin County Correctional Center I (also known as Franklin County Main Jail or FCCCI) is a 650-bed medium-maximum security correctional facility located in Columbus, Ohio. It is located at 2460 Jackson Pike, Columbus, OH 43223. It opened in 1986.

Misconduct

The jail came under fire in March 2009 when allegations came forward that a sheriff's deputy enlisted an inmate to touch a sandwich with his genitalia, then fed the sandwich to a fellow inmate.  The inmate consuming the sandwich was then shown a cell phone picture of the first inmate's genitalia touching the sandwich. The deputy, Joseph Cantwell, pleaded guilty to two health code violations on September 9, 2009.

In late 2017, news reports indicate jailers at the facility had repeatedly used Tasers to torture prisoners. Sergeant Mychal Turner used the device most often, including illegally on mentally-ill prisoners. He was promoted to the rank of major and command of the site.

References 

Buildings and structures in Columbus, Ohio
Prisons in Ohio
Jails in Ohio